Arne Landgraf (born 18 November 1977 in Neumünster) is a German rower.

References 
 

1977 births
Living people
German male rowers
People from Neumünster
World Rowing Championships medalists for Germany
Sportspeople from Schleswig-Holstein
21st-century German people